The Oyster was an erotic magazine published in London in 1883 by William Lazenby, a continuation of The Pearl. Unlike its predecessor, the emphasis was mainly on heterosexual pornography.

References

Erotica magazines published in the United Kingdom
Defunct magazines published in the United Kingdom
Magazines published in London
Magazines established in 1883
Magazines with year of disestablishment missing